Bryan Ansell is a British role-playing and war game designer. In 1985, he became managing director of Games Workshop, and bought Games Workshop from Steve Jackson and Ian Livingstone.

Education
Ansell attended Nottingham Boys High School and People's College.

Career
Bryan Ansell was the founder of and designer for Asgard Miniatures.  He had also run a fanzine entitled Trollcrusher. In 1979, Games Workshop partnered with Ansell to found the company Citadel Miniatures. Ansell designed Warhammer Fantasy Battle (1983) with Rick Priestley and Richard Halliwell. In 1985, Ansell became the managing director of Games Workshop. Along with Rick Priestley, Alan and Michael Perry, Richard Halliwell, John Blanche, Jervis Johnson, and Alan Merrett, Ansell was responsible for the Warhammer (later Warhammer Fantasy Battle) boom of the mid-to-late 1980s.

The contents page of White Dwarf #77 (May 1986) contained a coded message by the then editor Ian Marsh, who made the description of each item spell out "S O D O F F B R Y A N A N S E L L". This was a protest against the changes Ansell had demanded of the magazine. Ansell initiated a management buyout of the company in December 1991, refocusing Games Workshop on its most lucrative lines; the Warhammer Fantasy Battle (WFB) and Warhammer 40,000 (WH40k) miniature wargames.

He later left Games Workshop to Tom Kirby, concentrating on Wargames Foundry, a company which sells historical miniatures. These miniatures were originally sculpted by the Perry Twins for Citadel Miniatures, but were no longer sold as part of the Games Workshop fantasy ranges. Ansell took a number of figure moulds used for historical and fantasy figures under Citadel Miniatures and Games Workshop, and they have become part of the Wargames Foundry range.  Wargames Foundry continues to sell a range of metal figures for historical, sci-fi and fantasy war gaming.

Citadel Miniatures and Games Workshop
Bryan Ansell founded Citadel miniatures in 1978 to produce and manufacture 25mm scale historical and fantasy miniatures and games to be sold by Games Workshop. By 1982–83 Games Workshop was depending on sales of Citadel miniatures and games to survive. Around this time Bryan bought out all of Steve Jackson's and Ian Livingstone's shares in Games Workshop and absorbed Games Workshop into Citadel. All the Games Workshop operations (including White Dwarf) were moved from London to the Newark / Nottingham area to become part of Citadel with very few of the original Games Workshop staff staying on. Steve and Ian went off to live in Spain for a while. The company expanded rapidly and in 1991 Bryan Ansell sold his shares to Tom Kirby to concentrate on building houses and having children, but retained the entire Games Workshop collection of painted miniatures and artwork as well as rights and moulds for many of the ranges of miniatures which he now sells through his company Wargames Foundry.

Guernsey
After selling his shares in Games Workshop Bryan moved to Guernsey and founded Guernsey Foundry in 1991 to produce large ranges of Old West, Seven Years' War and Darkest Africa figures.

Wargames Foundry
Wargames Foundry (originally Bryan Ansell Miniatures Limited) was founded in 1983 as a retirement job for Bryan Ansell's father, Clifford Ansell, who had careers as a mining engineer specialising in dust suppression, in the Royal Navy and as a maths teacher. Wargames Foundry was up and running very quickly, originally selling ranges of historical miniatures that had been discontinued by Citadel. The Citadel/Games Workshop sculptors Michael and Alan Perry were also keen to make historical miniatures for Foundry in their spare time and continued to make more historical figures for Foundry. Rights, moulds and master castings continued to be transferred to Foundry until Bryan sold his shares in Games Workshop in 1991.

Foundry Miniatures Limited
Around 2000, Bryan Ansell moved back to Newark, merged Wargames Foundry and Guernsey Foundry, and took over the running of the company to produce the largest range of historical and fantasy miniatures in the world until he retired in 2005.

Ansell's decision to relocate Games Workshop to Nottingham in the 1980s led the area to become the centre of the British wargames industry, known as the lead belt.

Contributions

Laserburn (1980) Sci-fi tabletop rules
Imperial Commander (1981) expanded rules and background material for Laserburn, an influence on Warhammer 40,000
Warhammer Fantasy Battle (1983) Author
Forces of Fantasy for Warhammer Fantasy Battle (1983)
Statue of the Sorcerer, The (Call of Cthulhu) (1986) Chaosium
Vanishing Conjurer, The (Call of Cthulhu) (1986)
Warhammer Fantasy Roleplay (1986) Games Workshop Additional Material
Green and Pleasant Land supplement to Call of Cthulhu for adventuring in the British Isles (1987) published by Games Workshop Managing Director
Titan Legions (1994)
Street Violence (2003)
Rules With No Name Bryan Ansell, Editor Keith Pinfold, Foundry Books, 2009, 
 Foundry Miniatures Painting & Modeling Guide, Kevin Dallimore, Bryan Ansell, Foundry Books, 2006,

References

External links 
 Entry at Board Game Geek
 The brief History of Foundry Miniatures

Year of birth missing (living people)
Living people
Board game designers
Games Workshop